The Abbey of the Holy Redeemer (S. Salvatoris), also called St. Kilian's Abbey, was a Benedictine monastery in Würzburg, Germany. It was founded by Burchard, the first Bishop of Würzburg, about 745.

The monks had charge of Würzburg Cathedral (Salvatormünster) and the cathedral school. The latter gained considerable renown. Probably owing to laxity in observance of the rule, Bernwelf, Bishop of Würzburg, replaced the monks in 786 by canons who led a common life and were popularly styled Brothers of St. Kilian. The expelled monks, more than fifty in number, found a home at the Abbey of Neustadt on the Main, where Bishop Megingaud, who had resigned the See of Würzburg, was abbot.

Weblinks 
 Benediktinerkloster St. Kilian. In: WürzburgWiki

References

Attribution
 The entry cites:
 LINK, Klosterbuch der Diocese Würzburg, I (Würzburg, 1873), 105–8.
 WIELAND, Kloster und Ritterstift zu St. Burkard in Archiv des hist. Vereins fur Unterfranken, XV, fasc. 1–2.
 LINK, Klosterbuch, I (Würzburg, 1873), 395–402;
 LINDNER, Schriftsteller, O.S.B., in Bayern, 1750–1880, II (Ratisbon, 1880), 196–202.
 WIELAND, Dad Schottenkloster zu St. Jakob in Würzburg in Archiv des hist. Vereins fur Unterfranken, XVI, 21–182; LINK, Klosterbuch, I, 402–9.

Benedictine monasteries in Germany
Irish monastic foundations in continental Europe
8th-century establishments in Germany
Churches completed in 745
8th-century churches in Germany